John P. Burke (born July 31, 1960) is an American politician serving as a member of the Rhode Island Senate from the 9th district. Elected in November 2020, he assumed office on January 5, 2021.

Early life and education 
A native of West Warwick, Rhode Island, Burke graduated from Bishop Hendricken High School in 1978. He earned an associate degree in computer science from the Community College of Rhode Island.

Career 
Burke worked as a computer operator for Puritan Life Insurance before joining the University of Rhode Island in 1982. At URI, Burke worked as a programmer and database technician before retiring in 2021. He was elected to the Rhode Island Senate in November 2020 and assumed office in January 2021.

References 

1960 births
Living people
People from West Warwick, Rhode Island
Democratic Party Rhode Island state senators
Community College of Rhode Island alumni
University of Rhode Island faculty
Bishop Hendricken High School alumni